Science North is an interactive science museum in Greater Sudbury, Ontario, Canada.

The science centre, which is Northern Ontario's most popular tourist attraction, consists of two snowflake-shaped buildings on the southwestern shore of Ramsey Lake, just south of the downtown core, and a former ice hockey arena which includes the complex's entrance and an IMAX theatre. The snowflake buildings are connected by a rock tunnel, which passes through a billion-year-old geologic fault. This fault line was not known to be under the complex when the site was originally selected, and was discovered only during the construction of the building in the early 1980s. Where the walkway reaches the larger snowflake, the Vale Cavern auditorium is frequently used for temporary exhibits, press conferences, and other gala events by Science North and the wider community.

Inside the main building, a 20-metre fin whale skeleton, recovered from Anticosti Island, hangs from the ceiling.

The complex also features a boat tour, the William Ramsey, which offers touring cruises of the scenic Ramsey Lake. The Jim Gordon Boardwalk also extends from the facility to the city's Bell Park along the western shore of the lake.

The facility was designed by architect Raymond Moriyama, one of the founding partners of Moriyama & Teshima Architects, based in Toronto.

An agency of the provincial government of Ontario, Science North is overseen by the provincial Ministry of Culture.

Facilities

First level
 IMAX With Laser - Science North has a 3D IMAX with Laser theatre. The theatre opened in 1994, and was converted to 3D in February 2009.
 Planetarium - In June 2009, Science North added a planetarium. It has an 8-metre dome and 36 seats.
 Vale Cavern - Wildfires! A Firefighting Adventure in 3D.
 TD Canada Trust Toddler's Treehouse - A children's educational play area.

Second level
 Nature Exchange - Visitors collect and research natural items from the wild and are swapped for points in a database. The points can be used to "purchase" other natural artifacts from around the world (i.e.: Rocks, sea shells, fossils, etc.)
 Lapidary Lab - Visitors learn how to cut, grind and polish rocks to turn them from ordinary stones into works of art.
 F. Jean MacLeod Butterfly Gallery - A glass-enclosed butterfly house home to more than 400 butterflies from 30 different tropical species.

Third level
The exhibits on the third floor are divided into four main areas:
 Northern Forests - This area focuses on animals who live in northern forests. Some of the animals ambassadors for the Northern Forest include Drifter and Kashkuanashku (Kash) the beavers, Maple the porcupine and Saunders the skunk. Other notable animals include the Northern Flying Squirrels, the Grey Rat Snake and the Big Brown bats. One of the biggest improvements to the third floor include a nocturnal room, allowing people to see active nocturnal animals during the day and better equipment habitats for the animals and for visitors. Also, there is an intricate bee hive, behind a plate glass window, which allows visitors to see into the hive.
 Lakes and Rivers - In this area, animals that live in rivers and lakes are featured. The animals ambassadors on this floor include Kash the Beaver, the Common Snapping Turtle, the Northern Water Snakes and local fish found in Northern Ontario Lakes. This sections allow people to get a better understanding of the aquatics systems that surround Northern Ontario and the difficulties and challenges these systems are currently facing. As well, the stream table (also known as the sand table) shows people what is erosion and how erosion can shape the landscape around us.
 Wetlands - The wetlands area teaches about the complex wetlands ecosystems. With Lilly creek situated right beside Science North, people are able to go on Lilly Creek tours (weather permitting) and get a personal look of what makes wetland such an important landmass for our ecosystems. Some of the animal ambassadors include Northern Ontario frogs (including Green Frogs, Wood Frogs, Tree Frogs and Bullfrogs), American Toads, The Eastern Massasauga Rattlesnake and the painted turtle. This section also houses the SO2 monitor, which measures the sulphur dioxide levels in Sudbury. There is also an interactive computer that displays the current reading of other sulphur dioxide monitors located throughout the Greater Sudbury region.
 Discovery Theatre - The discovery theatre is located in the centre of the third and fourth levels of Science North. Here, live science shows cover topics ranging from fire to sound. A daily schedule, located in front of the theatre and on the LCD screens around the Science Centre, is kept up to date and people can schedule their day around the shows they want to see. Usually, upbeat music will be played two minutes before the show starts to allow people to know the show is about to begin. Wheelchair accessibly is offered on the first, and third level of the discovery theater.
 The Northern Garden - The Northern Garden is located outside of the science centre. This gives people the opportunity to learn about native plant species in Northern Ontario, plant growth and general garden maintenance.

Fourth level
 BodyZone - BodyZone teaches about DNA and how it makes people unique, and how bodies work. There are also many exhibits allowing visitors to measure their performance, such as the race track. The Club Genome object theatre entrance is also in BodyZone.
 Racetrack - Build a race car and run it on two circular track. This area has a K'Nex table.
 Space Place - This lab focuses on astronomy and space exploration. Exhibits include a  gravity well, a microgravity drop tower, exhibits on SNOLAB, and information on Canadian space exploration. The entrance to the "Between the Stars" object theatre is also found in Space Place. This show explores the topic of dark matter - why we know it exists, and how we are trying to detect it. Between the Stars opened in June 2010 and is designed to appeal to all age ranges with a cartoon character named String Man narrating the story of a topic that is quite complex.
 TechLab - Technology and engineering area where visitors can create circuits, take apart old electronics, and play with pulleys and gears.

Object theatres
Special film and video exhibits which change over time; current exhibits include
 The Global warming Changing Climate Show -- Narrated by Rick Mercer, the show was updated and reopened in March 2011.
 Between the Stars -- Addresses the evidence for dark matter, what it might be, and how scientists are trying to detect it at SNOLAB.
 Ready, Set, Move! -- Advocates and demonstrates healthy living through an interactive experience.

Outdoor grounds
 Polaris Boulevard - is a line which reaches from a large sundial right up the side of the building which points directly at Polaris (the north star).
 Terra - Visited stand on this one-millionth scale world model, outdoors near Science North's main entrance. At sunset and sunrise, the Earth's shadow moves across Canada. The benchmark at the centre of Terra is:  46° 28' 12.00" N and 80° 59' 45.70" W.
 A sculpture honouring local bush plane pilot Rusty Blakey.
 Lily Creek - a marsh located opposite to the centre, Lily Creek is home to many species of creatures.
 The Northern Forest - This outdoor exhibit features many of the tree species grown in northern Ontario that Domtar relies on for its sawmills and for the manufacture of pulp and paper at the Espanola mill.

Other activities
Science North, which was opened in 1984, also owns and operates Sudbury's Dynamic Earth facility, an earth sciences exhibition which is home to the Big Nickel, one of the city's most famous landmarks. From January 22, 2001, to May 10, 2003, the Big Nickel was temporarily located on the primary Science North grounds while Dynamic Earth was under construction.

The Science North Production Team produces object theatres, multi-media presentations and large format film productions for science museums and educational facilities around North America.

Science North's former science director, Alan Nursall, is a correspondent for the Canadian science newsmagazine series Daily Planet, which airs on Discovery Channel and on CTV. The institution's first science director, David Pearson, returned to the position in 2007.

Science North has also worked extensively with the city's Laurentian University on scientific and environmental research and as a partner in the university's graduate program in science communication.

Science North runs day camps in the summer, autumn, and winter.

COVID-19 
During the COVID-19 pandemic, Science North engaged in several programs to promote COVID-19 vaccines to youth, families and young adults. 

The museum received a $50,000 CAD grant in July 2021 from the Government of Canada for a project titled “Promoting Vaccine Confidence across Northern Ontario.” It was awarded through a grant program called “Encouraging Vaccine Confidence in Canada” jointly administered by the Canadian Institutes of Health Research (CIHR), Natural Sciences and Engineering Research Council (NSERC) and the Social Sciences and Humanities Research Council (SSHRC).

Science North also received a $500,000 grant from the Public Health Agency of Canada's Immunization Partnership Fund to target vaccine hesitant individuals through virtual and in-person activities including podcasts, webinars, digital content and events, museum exhibits and workshops.

References

External links
Science North
Science Communication

Museums established in 1984
IMAX venues
Museums in Greater Sudbury
Crown corporations of Ontario
Science museums in Canada
Raymond Moriyama buildings
Science centers
Butterfly houses
1984 establishments in Ontario